Xylotoles segrex is a species of beetle in the family Cerambycidae. It was described by Arthur Sidney Olliff in 1889. It is known from Australia, from Lord Howe Island.

References

Dorcadiini
Beetles described in 1889